The 2023 Men's Hockey Africa Qualifier for All Africa Games will be a series of 3 qualification events for the 2023 African Games in Accra, Ghana. The tournaments will be held in Nigeria and  Zimbabwe between August -  September 2022. The winners of each tournament will qualify for the 2023 Africa Games.

Qualification

Central-South Africa qualifier

Standings

Results

Final

Awards
The following awards were given at the conclusion of the tournament.

Goalscorers

References

Africa Qualifier for All Africa Games
August 2022 sports events in Africa
September 2022 sports events in Africa
2023 African Games
International field hockey competitions hosted by Zimbabwe